Blue Planet is the second studio album by Donna Lewis released in 1998. Her single "I Could Be the One" was a top-10 hit in Austria. Released by Atlantic Records, it would the last album that she released with the label.

Track listing
"Will Love Grow" – 4:35
"I Could Be the One" – 3:46
"Love Him" – 4:16
"Blue Planet" – 4:50
"Beauty & Wonder" – 3:17
"Heaven Sent You" – 7:25
"Harvest Moon" – 4:18
"Falling" – 4:16
"Lay Me Down" – 4:07
"Unforgiven" – 2:45
"Take Me Home" – 7:17 (includes a hidden instrumental outro track)
"10 Holy Nights" (Japanese bonus track)

References

1998 albums
Donna Lewis albums
Atlantic Records albums